Punter is an occupational surname of English origin, denoting a keeper (toll-collector) of a bridge .

People with the name
 Blaize Punter (born 1996), Antigua and Barbudan footballer
 Brian Punter (born 1935), English footballer
 David Punter (born 1949), English academic
 John Punter (born 1949), English record producer
 Kevin Punter (born 1993), American basketball player
 Steve Punter (born 1958), Canadian computer programmer

See also
 Punt (surname)
 Punter (disambiguation)

References

Surnames of English origin
Occupational surnames
English-language occupational surnames